Erick Johnson (born 1959) is an American contemporary artist living and working in New York City. His primary media are oil painting, drawing and photography.

Johnson was born in San Francisco and grew up in Los Angeles, CA and New Jersey. He attended the School of Visual Arts and received his B.A. from Empire State College and his M.F.A. from the Milton Avery School of the Arts at Bard College.

Johnson’s work has been featured in the New York Times, The Washington Post, Time Out New York, The New York Observer, Artcritical.com, The Brooklyn Rail, and artnet.

Selected solo exhibitions
2022 - Chroma Chord: New Paintings by Erick Johnson, Kathryn Markel Fine Art, NYC
2021 - Double Take, Brattleboro Museum & Art Center, Brattleboro, VT 
2018 - (Inside) Out: New Work by Erick Johnson, Gallery Neptune & Brown, Washington DC 
2016 - Streets for Evermore, Gallery Neptune & Brown, Washington DC 
2015 - Colorvane, IUCA+D Gallery, Indiana University, Columbus, IN 
2012 - New Work, Heskin Contemporary, NYC 
2010 - Parallelogram Paintings, Heskin Contemporary, NYC 
2000 - Erick Johnson, Recent Paintings and Drawings, Salena Gallery, Long Island University, Brooklyn, NY

Selected group exhibitions
2022 - Soho Artist History Walk, Pt 1, CITYarts, New York, NY
2021 - Odd Couple, Curated by Max Zlotsky Seiler, Kathryn Markel Fine Art, New York, NY
2020 - 10 X Relay, Indiana University J. Irwin Miller Architecture Program Gallery, Columbus, IN
2019 - You Are Not Alone, Casimir Effect, (Chashama space) 1022 Lexington Avenue, New York, NY
2019 - Double Vision: Artsits who Instagram, The Teaching Gallery, Hudson Valley Community College, Troy, NY (co-curated with Janice Caswell)\
2018 -  Erick Johnson/Malcolm Wright, Cynthia Reeves Gallery, The Barn at 28 Main St. Walpole NH
2017 - Double Vision:  Artists who Instagram, LABspace Gallery, Hillsdale, NY (co-curated with Janice Caswell)
2016 - Machines of Paint and Other Materials, 72 Front Street, Brooklyn NY
2014 - Out of Bounds, Neptune Fine Art, Washington DC
2013 - Abstract Gambol, Heskin Contemporary, NYC
2013 - Interior Space: Small Scale Abstract Painting, Salena Gallery, Long Island University, Brooklyn, NY
2012 - Abstract Gambol, Heskin Contemporary, NYC
2011 - Double Vision, Geoffrey Young Gallery, Gt. Barrington, MA
2010 - Casheesh 4, Geoffrey Young Gallery, Gt. Barrington, MA
2008 - It’s Gouache & Gouache Only, Andrea Meislin Gallery, NYC
2006 - Exquisite Abstraction, Whitespace Gallery, Atlanta, GA
2005 - NY Loves LV, Dust Gallery, Las Vegas, NV (curated by Lisa Stefanelli)
2002 - Jump, The Painting Center, NYC (curated by Ross Neher)
2001 - The Hard & the Soft, Thomas Korzelius Gallery, NYC (curated by Claire Jervert)

Grants & fellowships 

2019 - Vermont Studio Center Fellowship
2004 - Artist in Residence, St. Mary’s College, MD
2001 - Virginia Center for the Creative Arts Fellowship
1988 - Vermont Studio Center Fellowship
1982 - Foreign Study Scholarship, Cleveland Institute of Art/ Lacoste, France

References 

Living people
1959 births
American contemporary artists
20th-century American painters
Bard College alumni
Empire State College alumni
21st-century American painters